The South African Railways Class 14C 4-8-2 of 1919 was a steam locomotive.

In late 1919, the South African Railways placed a third batch of twenty  steam locomotives with a 4-8-2 Mountain type wheel arrangement in service. In addition to the first three batches, one more batch would be acquired in 1922, all four with different maximum axle loadings, to bring the total in the class to 73. Through reboilerings, rebalancings and cylinder bushings during its service life, this single class eventually ended up as six distinct locomotive classes with two boiler types and a multitude of axle loading and boiler pressure configurations.

Manufacturer
In 1919, a third batch of twenty Class 14C locomotives was ordered from the Montreal Locomotive Works (MLW) in Canada. It was delivered late in that same year and numbered in the range from 1991 to 2010. In 1922, one more batch of Class 14C locomotives would follow from the same manufacturer. All four batches differed in terms of maximum axle loading, adhesive weight and engine weight.

Characteristics
As built, the locomotives of the third batch were heavier than both previous batches,  heavier than the first and  heavier than the second.

Modifications and reclassifications
During 1920, it was found necessary to restay most of the fireboxes on the early orders of the Class 14C. Their reversing gear was of the single cylinder type and tended to creep. D.A. Hendrie, at the time the Chief Mechanical Engineer (CME) of the South African Railways (SAR), therefore fitted oil cylinders and installed his Hendrie reversing gear, which was manufactured in the Pretoria workshops during 1922. Modifications were also made to the finger bars and rocking grate cylinders of the firebox and to the sanding gear. Approximately  of lead were run into the smokebox saddle casting to provide additional weight on the leading bogie.

Watson Standard boilers
During the 1930s, many serving locomotives were reboilered with a standard boiler type designed by A.G. Watson, CME of the SAR at the time, as part of his standardisation policy. Such Watson Standard reboilered locomotives were reclassified by adding an "R" suffix to their classification.

Only slight alterations were necessary to the engine frames.

Their original Belpaire boilers were fitted with Ramsbottom safety valves, while the Watson Standard boiler was fitted with Pop safety valves. The reboilered engines were also equipped with Watson cabs with their distinctive slanted fronts, compared to the conventional vertical fronts of their original cabs. Early conversions were equipped with copper and later conversions with steel fireboxes.

Rebalancing
Around 1930, the question of maximum axle loads for locomotives was thoroughly investigated by the Mechanical and Civil Engineering Departments of the SAR. It was found that, along with some other locomotives, the Class 14C had a rather severe vertical hammer blow effect on the track when running at speed due to an undue proportion of the reciprocating parts being balanced. Modifications were accordingly made to the Class 14C to allow some of them to run on  track.

The locomotives had weights attached between the frames to increase adhesion. Over time, most of the Class 14C family of locomotives were "rebalanced" by having these weights increased or reduced to redistribute, increase or reduce the axle loading and adhesive weight by altering the loads on the individual coupled wheels, leading bogies and trailing pony trucks. Coupled wheel axle loading adjustment was achieved by attaching steel boxes, filled with an appropriate amount of lead, over each axle between the frames.

The lighter version of the rebalanced locomotives was reclassified to Class 14CB, with the "B" indicating branchline service. It is not clear which of these reboilering and rebalancing modifications were carried out first, one, the other, either one or together, but in whichever order, all twenty locomotives were eventually also reboilered with Watson Standard no. 2 boilers and reclassified to Class 14CRB. Reclassified Class 14C locomotives often did not receive new number plates. Instead, the previous Class number was milled out and a separate small plate, inscribed with the new Class number and "RB" suffix, was attached to the number plate.

Cylinder bushing
Several of the locomotives had their cylinders bushed to reduce the bore from the as-built .

Service
The third batch of the Class 14C was placed in service on the Cape Western system, where they banked up the Hex River railpass from De Doorns and later worked with Class 19C locomotives across Sir Lowry's Pass to Caledon and Bredasdorp in the Overberg. After the New Cape Central Railway was incorporated into the SAR in 1925, they were also employed on that line between Worcester and Mossel Bay.

Some served on the Umtata branch until it was dieselised early in 1973, after which they were also allocated to Cape Town. In their later years, most of these locomotives remained on the Cape Western system, shedded at Paardeneiland in Cape Town and at Beaufort West, and one at De Aar, mostly being used as shunting engines and on short local pick-ups.

Works numbers
The table lists their years built, manufacturer's works numbers, engine numbers and eventual classifications.

Illustration
The main picture shows Class 14CRB no. 2004 Purdey taking water at Robertson, Western Cape, on 10 November 1979.

References

1790
1790
4-8-2 locomotives
2D1 locomotives
MLW locomotives
Cape gauge railway locomotives
Railway locomotives introduced in 1919
1919 in South Africa